The Chrysler Air Raid Siren (second generation), or known as the Chrysler Bell Victory Siren (first generation) is an outdoor warning siren produced during the Cold War era that has an output of 138 dB(C) at .

History

In 1952, the cost of a Chrysler Air-raid Siren was $5,500 (Equivalent to $61,851 as in December 2022).The United States government helped buy sirens for selected state and county law enforcement agencies. In Los Angeles County, six were placed around key locations of populated areas, and another ten were sold to other government agencies in the state of California. These "Big Red Whistles" (as they were nicknamed) only saw testing use. Some were located so remotely that they deteriorated due to lack of maintenance.

The main purpose of the siren was to warn the public in the event of a nuclear attack by the Soviet Union during the Cold War. The operator's job was to start the engine and bring it up to operating speed, then to pull and release the transmission handle to start the wailing signal generation. The Chrysler Air-raid Siren produced the loudest sound ever achieved by an air raid siren.

Today
Some sirens are still located above buildings and watchtowers. Many are rusted, and in some cases, the salvage value is less than the cost to remove them. A majority have been moved to museums, and some have been restored to fully functioning condition.

In Seattle's Phinney Ridge neighborhood, a decommissioned air raid siren remains standing as a local landmark. Since 2014, the air raid tower is decorated as a Holiday GloCone annually from Thanksgiving to New Year's.

Cities with Chrysler Sirens

References

Civil defense
Warning systems
Chrysler
Aerophones
Sirens